Givi Matcharashvili (born 17 May 1997) is a Georgian freestyle wrestler. He won one of the bronze medals at the 2022 World Wrestling Championships in Belgrade. He represented Georgia at the 2019 European Games in Minsk, Belarus and he won the silver medal in the 125 kg event.

In 2022, he won the silver medal in his event at the Matteo Pellicone Ranking Series held in Rome, Italy.

Achievements

References

External links 
 

Living people
1997 births
Place of birth missing (living people)
Male sport wrestlers from Georgia (country)
Wrestlers at the 2019 European Games
European Games medalists in wrestling
European Games silver medalists for Georgia (country)
World Wrestling Championships medalists
21st-century people from Georgia (country)